The following lists events that happened during 1871 in New Zealand.

Incumbents

Regal and viceregal
Head of State – Queen Victoria
Governor – Sir George Ferguson Bowen

Government and law
The 1871 election takes place between 14 January and 1 February. The 5th New Zealand Parliament commences.

1 February – Māori elections are held for the first time in conjunction with a general election, although the first Māori MPs had been elected in 1868.

Speaker of the House – After the election Sir Francis Dillon Bell becomes Speaker replacing Sir David Monro who stood down at the end of 1870.
Premier – William Fox
Minister of Finance – Julius Vogel
Chief Justice – Hon Sir George Arney

Main centre leaders
Mayor of Auckland – Philip Philips
Mayor of Christchurch – Andrew Duncan followed by James Jameson
Mayor of Dunedin – Thomas Birch followed by Henry Fish
Mayor of Wellington – Joseph Dransfield

Events 
1 February: The Daily Telegraph begins publishing in Napier. It continues until 1999, when it merges with The Hawke's Bay Herald Tribune to form Hawke's Bay Today.
 5 July: New Zealand's first university, Otago opens its doors. It was absorbed into the University of New Zealand three years later.
The Westport News begins publication. The newspaper continues to publish Monday-Friday.

Sport

Athletics
The first amateur club is formed, in South Canterbury. Professional athletics is already well established.

Horse racing

Major race winners
New Zealand Cup: Peeress
New Zealand Derby: Defamation

Rugby union
 12 May: Founding of the Wellington Rugby club, the second rugby union club in New Zealand.

Shooting
Ballinger Belt: Captain Wales (Otago)

Births
 10 January: Hoeroa Tiopira, rugby union player
 10 March (in Europe): George William von Zedlitz, professor of languages
 6 June: Freeman Wright Holmes, jockey, horse driver, trainer and breeder

Deaths

Date unknown
Helen Ann Wilson, nurse and community leader (b. 1793)

See also
History of New Zealand
List of years in New Zealand
Military history of New Zealand
Timeline of New Zealand history
Timeline of New Zealand's links with Antarctica
Timeline of the New Zealand environment

References
General
 Romanos, J. (2001) New Zealand Sporting Records and Lists. Auckland: Hodder Moa Beckett. 
Specific

External links